Alejandro Fabbri and Leonardo Mayer were the defending champions, but they chose to not participate this year.
Rubén Ramírez Hidalgo and Santiago Ventura won in the final 6–3, 0–6, [10–8], against Máximo González and Eduardo Schwank.

Seeds

Draw

Draw

References
 Doubles Draw

Copa Petrobras Asuncion - Doubles
Copa Petrobras Asunción